Prince George station is a railway station in Prince George, British Columbia. It is on the Canadian National Railway mainline. Via Rail's Jasper–Prince Rupert train service overnights at this station between Prince Rupert and Jasper.

Footnotes 

Via Rail stations in British Columbia
Railway stations in Canada opened in 1922
Transport in Prince George, British Columbia
1922 establishments in British Columbia